Varaksino is a rural locality (a village) in Rostilovskoye Rural Settlement, Gryazovetsky District, Vologda Oblast, Russia. The population was 259 as of 2002.

Geography 
Varaksino is located 36 km south of Gryazovets (the district's administrative centre) by road. Iyevlevo is the nearest rural locality.

References 

Rural localities in Gryazovetsky District